Rayan Rupert (born 31 May 2004) is a French professional basketball player for the New Zealand Breakers of the National Basketball League.

Career
On 9 June 2022, the New Zealand Breakers announced that they had signed Rupert. The Breakers had seen two Frenchmen, Ousmane Dieng and Hugo Besson, selected the year prior in the 2022 NBA draft.

Personal life
Rupert's father was former French men's national basketball team captain Thierry Rupert. 

Rayan's sister Iliana is also a basketball player who plays for the Atlanta Dream of the Women's National Basketball Association. She represented France at EuroBasket Women 2019 and 2021, as well as the 2020 Summer Olympics.

References

External links
RealGM profile

 

2004 births
Living people
New Zealand Breakers players
French expatriate sportspeople in New Zealand
French men's basketball players
Shooting guards
Sportspeople from Strasbourg